The Premio Primi Passi is a Group 3 flat horse race in Italy open to two-year-old thoroughbreds. It is run at Milan over a distance of 1,200 metres (about 6 furlongs), and it is scheduled to take place each year in June or July.

It is Italy's first Group race of the year for two-year-olds.

Records
Leading jockey since 1988 (4 wins):
 Mirco Demuro – Solitary Dancer (1998, dead-heat), Rolly Polly (2000), Blu Constellation (2010), Fontanelice (2014)

Leading trainer since 1988 (4 wins):

 Bruno Grizzetti – Della Scala (1997), Rolly Polly (2000), Orpen Shadow (2009), Ottone (2015)

Winners since 1988

 Obe Gold finished first in 2004, but he was relegated to second place following a stewards' inquiry.

Earlier winners

 1975: Northern Spring
 1976: West In
 1977: El Muleta
 1978: Ladislao di Oppelm
 1979: My Pardo
 1980: Erodoto
 1981: Grease
 1982: Faith Guest
 1983: Executive Man
 1984: Balqis
 1985: Assisi del Santo
 1986: Stay Low
 1987: Rey Carlos

See also
 List of Italian flat horse races

References
 Racing Post:

 galopp-sieger.de – Premio Primi Passi.
 horseracingintfed.com – International Federation of Horseracing Authorities – Premio Primi Passi (2016).
 pedigreequery.com – Premio Primi Passi – Milano San Siro.

Flat horse races for two-year-olds
Horse races in Italy
Sport in Milan